Ringbone is exostosis (bone growth) in the pastern or coffin joint of a horse. In severe cases, the growth can encircle the bones, giving ringbone its name. It has been suggested by some authors that such a colloquial term, whilst commonly used, might be misleading and that it would be better to refer to this condition as osteoarthritis of the inter-phalangeal joints in ungulates (Rogers and Waldron, 1995: 34-35).

Ringbone can be classified by its location, with "high ringbone" occurring on the lower part of the large pastern bone or the upper part of the small pastern bone. "Low ringbone" occurs on the lower part of the small pastern bone or the upper part of the coffin bone. High ringbone is easier seen than low ringbone, as low ringbone occurs in the hoof of the horse. However, low ringbone may be seen if it becomes serious, as it creates a bony bump on the coronet of the horse.

Causes
 Excessive tension on the tendons, ligaments, and joint capsules of the pastern area can strain the periosteum. The body compensates by growing bone at the stresspoint. Strain on the extensor tendon, the superficial digital flexor tendon branches, the collateral ligaments, and the distal sesamoidean ligaments are all common factors. If these tissues are stretched or torn, and the joint is unstabilized by the injury, new bone is produced to help to stabilize the joint.
 Osteoarthritis (the endstage of degenerative joint disease) of the pastern or coffin joint is a very common cause of articular ringbone. Bone is then produced to try to immobilize the joint and to relieve the chronic inflammation of the joint capsule. This process may take years, and lameness will continue until the joint is completely immobilized.
 Trauma to the periosteum can cause bone growth on the pastern bone. However, this is usually not progressive unless nearby soft tissue was also harmed and thus the joint instability was affected.
 Poor shoeing and conformation, such as long, sloping pasterns, upright pasterns, long-toes with low heels, pigeon toes, splay foot, or unbalanced feet may predispose the horse to ringbone, as they create uneven stress on the pastern and coffin joint, unequal tension on the soft tissues, or worsen the concussion that is absorbed by the pastern area.

Signs
Ringbone usually occurs in the front legs but can also be in the hind legs, and is usually worse in one leg than the other. Ringbone is most often found in mature horses, especially those in intensive training.

High ringbone: The horse will have a bony growth around the pastern area, and the pastern will have less mobility. The horse will show pain when the pastern joint is moved or rotated. Early cases will have a lameness score of 1-2 out of 5, with little or no bony swelling seen, although possibly felt when compared to the opposite pastern. Lameness will worsen to a grade 2-3 on a scale of 5 as the ringbone worsens.

Low ringbone: The horse will have moderate lameness (grade 2-3), even in early cases, because of the closeness of the ringbone to the other structures in the hoof. When severe or very advanced, the bony growth will be able to be seen on the coronet.

Treatment
Ringbone is degenerative (unless it is caused by direct trauma). Treatment works to slow down the progress of the bony changes and alleviate the horse's pain, rather than working to cure it.

Shoeing: The farrier should balance the hoof and apply a shoe that supports the heels and allows for an easy breakover.

NSAIDs: or non-steroidal anti-inflammatory drugs help to alleviate the pain and reduce inflammation within and around the joints. Often NSAIDs make the horse comfortable enough to continue ridden work, which is good for the horse's overall health.

Joint injections: The pastern joint can be injected directly, typically with a form of corticosteroid and hyaluronic acid.

Extracorporeal shockwave therapy: A high intensity specialized percussion device can help to remodel new bone tissue and decrease pain.

Arthrodesis: the fusion of the two bones of the pastern joints eliminates the instability of the joint, and thus the inflammation. This procedure may then eliminate the horse's lameness as well. However, surgical alteration of the joint can promote the growth of bone in the area, which is cosmetically displeasing. Arthrodesis of the coffin joint is usually not performed due to the location of the joint (within the hoof) and because the coffin joint needs some mobility for the horse to move correctly (unlike the pastern joint, which is very still).

Interleukin-1 receptor antagonist protein (IRAP) blocks IL-1 from binding to tissues and inhibits the damaging consequences of IL-1.

Microcurrent technology: Tissue, including muscle, tendons, ligaments, skin and bone, is formed from a large mass of similar cells that perform specific functions. These cells use tiny sequences of electric current, measured in millionths of an amp, to organise, monitor and regulate a stable state within the body. 
When there is injury, damage or disease to a tissue, there is disruption to the normal electrical current within the cells and things fail to work properly. By introducing the correct sequences the body's natural electric circuitry is replicated and kick starts and accelerates normal functioning.

Prognosis
If the ringbone is close to a joint, the prognosis for the horse's continued athletic use is not as good as if the ringbone is not near a joint. Ringbone that is progressing rapidly has a poorer prognosis as well.

Horses that are not performing strenuous work, such as jumping or working at speed, will probably be usable for years to come. However, horses competing in intense sports may not be able to continue at their previous level, as their pastern joints are constantly stressed.

Sources

King, Christine, BVSc, MACVSc, and Mansmann, Richard, VDM, PhD. 1997. "Equine Lameness." Equine Research, Inc. Pages 694-699.

Rogers, J and Waldron, T. 1995. "A Field Guide to Joint Disease in Archaeology". Chichester: John Wiley & Sons.

Equine injury and lameness